gRPC (gRPC Remote Procedure Calls) is a cross-platform open source high performance remote procedure call (RPC) framework. gRPC was initially created by Google, which has used a single general-purpose RPC infrastructure called Stubby to connect the large number of microservices running within and across its data centers for over a decade. In March 2015, Google decided to build the next version of Stubby and make it open source. The result was gRPC, which is now used in many organizations aside from Google to power use cases from microservices to the “last mile” of computing (mobile, web, and Internet of Things). It uses HTTP/2 for transport, Protocol Buffers as the interface description language, and provides features such as authentication, bidirectional streaming and flow control, blocking or nonblocking bindings, and cancellation and timeouts. It generates cross-platform client and server bindings for many languages. Most common usage scenarios include connecting services in a microservices style architecture, or connecting mobile device clients to backend services.

gRPC's complex use of HTTP/2 makes it impossible to implement a gRPC client in the browser, instead requiring a proxy.

Authentication 
gRPC supports the usage of Transport Layer Security (TLS) and token-based authentication. Connection to Google services must use TLS. There are two types of credentials: channel credentials and call credentials.
For token-based authorization, gRPC provides Server Interceptor and a Client Interceptor.

Encoding 

gRPC uses Protocol Buffers to encode data. Contrary to REST APIs with JSON, they have a more strict specification. Due to having a single specification, gRPC eliminates debate and saves developer time because gRPC is consistent across platforms and implementations.

Adoption 
A number of different organizations have adopted gRPC, such as Uber, Square, Netflix, IBM, CoreOS, Docker, CockroachDB, Cisco, Juniper Networks, Spotify, Zalando, Dropbox, and Google as the original developer.

The open source project u-bmc uses gRPC to replace Intelligent Platform Management Interface (IPMI). On 8 January 2019, Dropbox announced that the next version of "Courier", their RPC framework at the core of their service-oriented architecture (SOA), would be migrated to be based on gRPC, primarily because it aligned well with their existing custom RPC frameworks.

Alternatives to gRPC
 Cap'n Proto
 Apache Thrift
 Apache Avro
 JSON-RPC
 XML-RPC

See also

 Comparison of data serialization formats

References

External links
gRPC Home Page
gRPC – github.com
gRPC – opensource.google.com

Remote procedure call
Software using the BSD license
Google software